Mönckeberg's arteriosclerosis,  or Mönckeberg's sclerosis, is a form of arteriosclerosis or vessel hardening, where calcium deposits are found in the muscular middle layer of the walls of arteries (the tunica media).  It is an example of dystrophic calcification. This condition occurs as an age-related degenerative process. However, it can occur in pseudoxanthoma elasticum and idiopathic arterial calcification of infancy as a pathological condition, as well. Its clinical significance and cause are not well understood and its relationship to atherosclerosis and other forms of vascular calcification are the subject of disagreement.
Mönckeberg's arteriosclerosis is named after Johann Georg Mönckeberg, who first described it in 1903.

Signs and symptoms
Typically, Mönckeberg's arteriosclerosis is not associated with symptoms unless complicated by atherosclerosis, calciphylaxis, or accompanied by some other disease. However, the presence of Mönckeberg's arteriosclerosis is associated with poorer prognosis. This is probably due to vascular calcification causing increased arterial stiffness, increased pulse pressure and resulting in exaggerated damage to the heart and kidneys.

Cause
Minor degrees of calcification of the cardiovascular system are common in elderly people, and the prevalence of vascular calcification is increased by some diseases (see Epidemiology section).
Vascular calcification results from the deposition of calcium phosphate crystals (hydroxyapatite) as  a consequence of disordered calcium phosphate regulation in the blood vessel. Hydroxyapatite is secreted in vesicles that bleb out from vascular smooth muscle cells or pericytes in the arterial wall. The mechanism of vascular calcification is not fully understood, but probably involves a phenotypic change in the vascular smooth muscle cells in the wall with activation of bone-forming programs. Numerous regulators of calcification such as osteopontin, osteoprotegerin, matrix gla protein and fetuin-A, receptor activator of NF-kappa-B, receptor activator of NF-kappa-B ligand and tumor necrosis factor (TNF)-related apoptosis-inducing ligand protein have been implicated in this process.

It is unclear whether Mönckeberg's arteriosclerosis is a distinct entity or forms part of a spectrum of vascular calcification that includes atherosclerosis and calcification in the inner layer of the artery wall (tunica intima), calcification of the internal elastic lamina, calcification of cardiac valves and widespread soft tissue calcification. The existence of Mönckeberg's arteriosclerosis has been disputed and it has been proposed that it is a part of a continuum of atherosclerotic disease:  the majority of atherosclerotic plaques contain some calcium deposits and calcification of the internal elastic lamina is common in pathological specimens labelled as Mönckeberg's arteriosclerosis. However studies in animals suggest that a predominantly medial pattern of vascular calcification reflects different underlying mechanisms of disease, and despite involvement of the internal elastic lamina, evidence of inflammation is rare in Mönckeberg's arteriosclerosis.

Diagnosis
Often Mönckeberg's arteriosclerosis is discovered as an incidental finding in an X-ray radiograph, on mammograms,  in autopsy, or in association with investigation of some other disease, such as diabetes mellitus or chronic kidney disease.  Typically calcification is observed in the arteries of the upper and lower limb although it has been seen in numerous other medium size arteries. In the radial or ulnar arteries it can cause "pipestem" arteries, which present as a bounding pulse at the end of the calcific zone. It may also result in "pulselessness." Epidemiological studies have used the ratio of ankle to brachial blood pressure (ankle brachial pressure index, ABPI or ABI) as an indicator of arterial calcification with ABPI >1.3 to >1.5 being used as a diagnostic criterion depending on the study.

Management

Epidemiology
The prevalence of Mönckeberg's arteriosclerosis increases with age and is more frequent in diabetes mellitus, chronic kidney disease, systemic lupus erythematosus, chronic inflammatory conditions, hypervitaminosis D and rare genetic disorders, such as Keutel syndrome. The prevalence of Mönckeberg's arteriosclerosis in the general population has been estimated as <1% on the basis of an ankle brachial pressure index >1.5; however the validity of this criterion is questionable.

References

External links 

Vascular diseases